Jadwiżyn may refer to the following places:
Jadwiżyn, Kuyavian-Pomeranian Voivodeship (north-central Poland)
Jadwiżyn, Drawsko County in West Pomeranian Voivodeship (north-west Poland)
Jadwiżyn, Koszalin County in West Pomeranian Voivodeship (north-west Poland)
Jadwiżyn, Szczecinek County in West Pomeranian Voivodeship (north-west Poland)
Jadwiżyn, Wałcz County in West Pomeranian Voivodeship (north-west Poland)